The Ngongotaha Chiefs are a New Zealand rugby league club. They are from Ngongotahā in the Bay of Plenty. In 2000 and 2001 they competed in the Bartercard Cup but now they compete in the Bay of Plenty Rugby League competition.

Notable players

Over the years the club has seen many talented players but the most famous name associated with the club would be the Orchard brothers; Robert, Phillip, Eddie and John.  Robert and Phillip represented NZ, Phillip has recently been inducted into the NZRL Hall Of Fame.

Bartercard Cup
The Chiefs took part in the 2000 and 2001 Bartercard Cup competitions. In 2000 they won four games, enough to finish above the Porirua Pumas. However, in 2001 they were not at all competitive, losing the first sixteen games convincingly. After this, they pulled out of the competition and did not compete in the final six rounds.

External links
 Official Site

New Zealand rugby league teams
Rugby league in the Bay of Plenty
Rugby clubs established in 1938
1938 establishments in New Zealand